Heart over Mind may refer to:

 Heart over Mind (Anne Murray album), 1984
 Heart over Mind (Jennifer Rush album), 1987
 Heart over Mind (Tammy Wynette album), 1990
 "Heart over Mind" (song), a 1992 song by Kim Wilde